Giancarlo Giuseppe Alessandro Esposito (born April 26, 1958) is an American actor. He is best known for portraying Gus Fring in the AMC crime drama series Breaking Bad, from 2009 to 2011, as well as in its prequel series Better Call Saul, from 2017 to 2022. For this role, he won the Critics' Choice Television Award for Best Supporting Actor in a Drama Series and earned three nominations for the Primetime Emmy Award for Outstanding Supporting Actor in a Drama Series.

Esposito's other television roles include Federal Agent Mike Giardello in the NBC police drama series Homicide: Life on the Street (1998–1999), Sidney Glass / Magic Mirror in the ABC supernatural drama series Once Upon a Time (2011–2017), Tom Neville in the NBC science-fiction series Revolution (2012–2014), Dr. Edward Ruskins in the Netflix comedy-drama series Dear White People (2017–2021), Stan Edgar in the Amazon Prime Video superhero drama series The Boys (2019–present) and The Boys Presents: Diabolical (2022–present), and Moff Gideon in the Disney+ space western drama series The Mandalorian (2019–present), the lattermost of which earned him two Primetime Emmy Award nominations. He also portrayed American Baptist pastor and politician Adam Clayton Powell Jr. in the TV series Godfather of Harlem (2019–present) and appeared in Westworld (2016). Esposito voices antagonist Faraday in the Netflix anime series Cyberpunk: Edgerunners (2022). Esposito also voices Antón Castillo, the main antagonist of the video game Far Cry 6, who was modeled after Esposito's appearance. He was also included in the videogame Payday 2, as the supporting character, then antagonist "The Dentist".

He is also known for his appearances in several Spike Lee films, such as School Daze (1988), Do the Right Thing (1989), Mo' Better Blues (1990), and Malcolm X (1992). Esposito's other major films include Taps (1981), King of New York (1990), Bob Roberts (1990), Harley Davidson and the Marlboro Man (1991), Fresh (1994), The Usual Suspects (1995), Ali (2001), Last Holiday (2006), Gospel Hill (2008), Rabbit Hole (2010), Maze Runner: The Scorch Trials (2015), The Jungle Book (2016), Money Monster (2016), Okja (2017), Maze Runner: The Death Cure (2018), and Stargirl (2020).

Early life 
Giancarlo Giuseppe Alessandro Esposito was born in Copenhagen, Denmark, the son of Giovanni "John" C. Esposito (1931–2002), an Italian stagehand and carpenter from Naples, and Elizabeth "Leesa" Foster (1926–2017), an African-American opera and nightclub singer from Alabama.

When Esposito was six, his family moved to Manhattan. He attended Elizabeth Seton College in New York and earned a two-year degree in radio and television communications.

Career 

Esposito made his Broadway debut in 1968, playing an enslaved child opposite Shirley Jones in the short-lived musical Maggie Flynn (1968), set during the New York Draft Riots of 1863. He was also a member of the youthful cast of the Stephen Sondheim-Harold Prince collaboration Merrily We Roll Along, which closed with 16 performances and 56 previews in 1981.

During the 1980s, Esposito appeared in films such as Maximum Overdrive, King of New York, and Trading Places. He also performed in TV shows such as Miami Vice and Spenser: For Hire. He played J. C. Pierce, a cadet in the 1981 movie Taps.

In 1988, he landed his breakout role as the leader ("Dean Big Brother Almighty") of the black fraternity "Gamma Phi Gamma" in director Spike Lee's film School Daze, exploring color relations at black colleges. Over the next four years, Esposito and Lee collaborated on three other movies: Do the Right Thing, Mo' Better Blues, and Malcolm X. During the 1990s, Esposito appeared in the acclaimed indie films Night on Earth, Fresh and Smoke, as well as its sequel Blue in the Face. He also appeared in the mainstream films Harley Davidson and the Marlboro Man with Mickey Rourke, Reckless with Mia Farrow, and Waiting to Exhale starring Whitney Houston and Angela Bassett. In 1996, Esposito was featured in a music video "California" by French superstar Mylène Farmer, directed by Abel Ferrara.

Esposito played FBI agent Mike Giardello on the TV crime drama Homicide: Life on the Street. That role drew from both his African American and Italian ancestry. He played this character during the show's seventh and final season, and reprised the role for its 2000 made-for-TV movie. He had another multiracial role as Sergeant Paul Gigante in the television comedy, Bakersfield P.D.

In 1997, Esposito played the film roles of Darryl in Trouble on the Corner and Charlie Dunt in Nothing to Lose. Other TV credits include NYPD Blue, Law & Order, The Practice, New York Undercover, and Fallen Angels: Fearless.

Esposito has portrayed drug dealers (Fresh, Breaking Bad, King of New York, Better Call Saul), policemen (The Usual Suspects, Derailed), political radicals (Bob Roberts, Do the Right Thing), and a demonic version of the Greek God of Sleep Hypnos from another dimension (Monkeybone). In 2001, he played Cassius Marcellus Clay, Sr. in Ali, and Miguel Algarín, friend and collaborator of Nuyorican poet Miguel Piñero, in Piñero.

In 2002, Esposito was cast as a legal eagle in the David E. Kelley television drama Girls Club. Although the series only lasted one season, and did not garner generally positive reviews, it represented a personal turning point for Esposito, who relayed to The Washington Post: "I started to play bosses. And I realized, 'Oh, okay, this is an opportunity.' It was really a great opening for me to show who I really was. And it's kept going like that."

In 2005, Esposito played an unsympathetic detective named Esposito in the film Hate Crime, which centers upon homophobia as a theme.

In 2006, Esposito starred in Last Holiday as Senator Dillings, alongside Queen Latifah and Timothy Hutton. Esposito played Robert Fuentes, a Miami businessman with shady connections, on the UPN television series South Beach. He appeared in New Amsterdam and CSI: Miami. In Feel the Noise (2007), he played ex-musician Roberto, the Puerto Rican father of Omarion Grandberry's character, aspiring rap star "Rob". In 2008, he made his directorial debut with Gospel Hill, serving also as producer and star of the film.

New York theater credits for Esposito include The Me Nobody Knows, Lost in the Stars, Seesaw, and Merrily We Roll Along. In 2008, he appeared on Broadway as Gooper in an African American production of Tennessee Williams' Pulitzer Prize-winning drama Cat on a Hot Tin Roof, directed by Debbie Allen and starring James Earl Jones, Phylicia Rashad, Anika Noni Rose, and Terrence Howard.

From 2009 to 2011, Esposito appeared in seasons 2 through 4 of the AMC drama Breaking Bad, as Gus Fring, the head of a New Mexico-based methamphetamine drug ring. In the fourth season, he was the show's primary antagonist, and won critical acclaim for this role. He won the Best Supporting Actor in a Drama award at the 2012 Critics' Choice Television Awards and was nominated for an Outstanding Supporting Actor in a Drama Series award at the 2012 Primetime Emmy Awards, but lost to co-star Aaron Paul.

Esposito appeared in the film Rabbit Hole (2010). He also appeared in the first season of the ABC program Once Upon a Time, which debuted in October 2011. He portrayed the split role of Sidney Glass, a reporter for The Daily Mirror in the town of Storybrooke, Maine, who is really a genie trapped in the Magic Mirror, possessed by The Evil Queen in a parallel fairy tale world. Esposito would periodically reprise the role in later seasons as a guest star. Esposito appeared in Revolution as Major Tom Neville, a central character who kills Ben Matheson in the pilot. He escorts a captured Danny to the capital Philadelphia of the Monroe Republic.

Esposito also appeared in Community as a guest star for the episode titled "Digital Estate Planning". He performed again in the fourth season, in the episode titled "Paranormal Parentage". Esposito has additionally appeared in a video of the action role-playing sci-fi first-person shooter game Destiny, as well as plays The Dentist, a non-playable story character, in the game Payday 2.

He has joined the DC Universe Animated Original Movies series. He played Ra's al Ghul in Son of Batman and Eric Needham / Black Spider in Batman: Assault on Arkham. He also had a recurring role in the first season of The Get Down on Netflix. In 2017, Esposito reprised his role as Gus Fring in the Breaking Bad prequel series, Better Call Saul. In 2019, he appeared in the first-season finale of The Boys as Stan Edgar, and reprised the role in the second and third season.

In 2016, Esposito voiced Akela in the film The Jungle Book, which was directed by Jon Favreau. Esposito and Favreau would work together once again in the Disney+ series The Mandalorian in which Esposito appears in a starring role, while Favreau acts as an executive producer for the series and as its writer. He plays the role of New York congressman Adam Clayton Powell Jr. in the 2019 Epix series Godfather of Harlem.

In July 2020, Esposito began teasing his role in "a huge video game". His role was later revealed as the main antagonist of Ubisoft's Far Cry 6, in which he would portray and voice Antón Castillo, the dictatorial ruler of Yara.

In 2022, Esposito played Taxi Driver in Euphoria, a film installation by Julian Rosefeldt.

Personal life 
Esposito was married to Joy McManigal. They have four daughters. They subsequently divorced.

He was raised Catholic and considered becoming a priest.

Filmography

Film

Television

Video games

Other work

Awards and nominations

References

External links 

 
 
 

1958 births
Living people
African-American male actors
American male film actors
American male television actors
American male video game actors
American male voice actors
American people of Italian descent
Male actors from Copenhagen
Male actors from New York City
People from Manhattan
20th-century African-American people
21st-century African-American people
20th-century American male actors
21st-century American male actors